Melody is a 2015 Indian Kannada-language film directed by Srivatsa, starring Rajesh Krishnan, Karthika Menon, Chethan Gandharva and Akshatha Marla in lead roles.

Plot 
Kiran is a software engineer who falls in love with Anu. Since Kiran has no experience with women, his friend Madhu acts as Kiran on Facebook and befriends Anu. A confused Anu tells Kiran's friend Benny "to check on him".

Cast

Rajesh Krishnan as Kiran
Karthika Menon as Anu
Chethan Gandharva as Madhu
Akshatha Marla 
Ramakrishna
Mandya Ramesh
Rockline Sudhakar
Shamanth K Rao

Music

Reception

Critical response 

Shyam Prasad S of Bangalore Mirror scored the film at 3 out of 5 stars and says "Glamour is missing though the film is colourful. The film could also have been a bit crispier. Melody makes for a leisurely laidback watch". S Vishwanath of Deccan Herald wrote "Melody works wonderfully despite its pitfalls. Yes, as its tagline says, just love maadi, for it is as much a treat to youth as it is to the entire family". The Times of India scored the film at 3 out of 5 stars and says "Though Rajesh Krishnan and Kartika Menon have done well, it is Chethan Gandharva and Akshatha Marla who steal the show with their lively performance. Camera by RV Nageshwara Rao and music by L N Sastry are average". Sify wrote "The movie also lacks good music and good dialogues. With such award-winning singers on board, the team could have worked hard in upgrading the music of the film. Director Nanjunda Krishna has tried to apply ‘tele-serial formulae’ which has failed miserably!"

References

2010s Kannada-language films
2015 films